Ryan Kittman Rupe (born March 31, 1975) is a former right-handed pitcher in Major League Baseball. Rupe played in the majors for the Tampa Bay Devil Rays and Boston Red Sox.

Rupe made his major league debut in 1999 for the Devil Rays, pitching in 24 starts while finishing with an 8-9 record. He was the first player drafted by the team to make the majors. The following season, Rupe had a horrendous season while battling with knee problems. Rupe finished the 2000 season with an ERA of 6.92, 75 runs allowed in 91 innings and 19 home runs allowed in just 18 starts.

In 2001, Rupe managed to pitch in 28 games (26 starts) for the Devil Rays but with awful numbers. In 143.1 innings, he allowed 30 home runs and 111 runs to go along with a record of 5-12. His ERA finished at 6.59, the following season, Rupe recorded a decision in all 15 starts he had, going 5-10 during that stretch. He was released following the season.

Rupe ended his Devil Rays career with a 23-37 career record.

Rupe signed a minor league contract with the Boston Red Sox. Rupe spent the majority of the season at the AAA level, appearing in just 4 games for the Red Sox towards the end of the year.

In 2004, Rupe played in Japan for the Hokkaido Nippon Ham Fighters. For the 2005 and 2006 seasons, Rupe spent time in the Los Angeles Dodgers and Florida Marlins minor league systems.

References

External links

1975 births
Living people
Major League Baseball pitchers
Tampa Bay Devil Rays players
Boston Red Sox players
Texas A&M Aggies baseball players
American expatriate baseball players in Japan
Hokkaido Nippon-Ham Fighters players
Durham Bulls players
Pawtucket Red Sox players
Las Vegas 51s players
Albuquerque Isotopes players
Hudson Valley Renegades players
Charleston RiverDogs players
Orlando Rays players
People from Houston
Baseball players from Texas